Pseudoclivina testacea is a species of ground beetle in the family Carabidae, found in West Africa.

References

testacea
Beetles described in 1846